Hans F. Sennholz (3 February 1922 – 23 June 2007) was a German-born American Austrian School economist and prolific author who studied under Ludwig von Mises. A Luftwaffe pilot during World War II, he was shot down over North Africa on 31 August 1942, and spent the remainder of the war in a POW camp in the United States.

After returning to Germany, Sennholz took degrees at the universities of Marburg in 1948 and Köln in 1949. He then moved to the United States to study for a Ph.D. at New York University where he became Mises' first PhD student in the United States. He taught economics at Grove City College, 1956–1992. After he retired, he became president of the Foundation for Economic Education, 1992–1997.

Early life

World War II 
He was drafted into the Luftwaffe during World War II and became the pilot of a Messerschmitt Bf 109, earning the Iron Cross for valor from his engagements in Norway, France, and Russia. He was shot down over North Africa on August 31, 1942, at a time when the battle for north Africa was intensifying, and spent the remainder of the war in a POW camp in the United States, ultimately located to a POW camp in Wilson, Arkansas, where he worked from 1945 to 1946 at the Wilson dairy farm "milking 20 cows twice a day".

Wartime diary 
During his stay in Arkansas, he maintained a journal of his time as a POW prisoner. When he was transferred back to Germany in 1946, he gave the journal to a trusted guard. "Please send this to my home when the time comes." But the journal never arrived.

In 1964, William Harrison, a factory worker in Jonesboro, Arkansas, found the journal along the banks of Bay Ditch, a drainage artery bordering 'old' Highway 63, and kept it. In November, 1985, Harrison took the journal to Scott Darwin, a professor of German at Arkansas State University. Darwin informed Harrison that no one on staff could read it because it had been hand written in a script of German that was no longer used. The journal was eventually translated by Erika Cohen, the German-born wife of Robert S. Cohen, M.D., whom she married while he was serving in the U.S. Army Medical Corps. Having attended school in the 1930s, she was able to read the script.

The journal told the story of its author's life as a Luftwaffe pilot, being shot down in north Africa and his subsequent time as a German POW in Arkansas. There was no indication as to the identity of the author. This, perhaps, was intentional, as POWs were not supposed to have personal possessions.

In 1988, Harrison published the story, "Who Wrote the Diary", in Die Welt, a large-circulation German newspaper. Willie Weischhoff read the story, which mentioned him by name, and wrote to his friend and fellow German POW, Hans Sennholz, a professor of economics at Grove City College. On October 20, 1988, Harrison received a letter from Sennholz stating: "I am the POW author you have been looking for."

Post-war education and career
After returning to Germany, Sennholz took degrees at the universities of Marburg in 1948 and Köln in 1949. He then moved to the United States to study for a Ph.D. at New York University. He was Ludwig von Mises' first PhD student in the United States. He taught economics at Grove City College, 1956–1992, having been hired as department chair upon arrival. After he retired, he became president of the Foundation for Economic Education, 1992–1997. Calvinist Political Philosopher, John W. Robbins, pointed out in a book printed in honor of Sennholz shortly after his death that "Sennholz, ... rests his defense of a free society on revelation."

Fellow Austrian School economist, Joseph Salerno, praised Sennholz as an under-appreciated member of the Austrian School who "writes so clearly on such a broad range of topics that he is in danger of suffering the same fate as Say and Bastiat. As Joseph Schumpeter pointed out, these two brilliant nineteenth-century French economists, who were also masters of economic rhetoric, wrote with such clarity and style that their work was misjudged by their British inferiors as 'shallow' and 'superficial'."

Sennholz's influence
2008 U.S. presidential candidate, Ron Paul, credits his interest in economics to meeting Sennholz and getting to know him well. Peter Boettke, Director of the F. A. Hayek Program for Advanced Study in Philosophy, Politics, and Economics at the Mercatus Center at George Mason University, first learned economics from Sennholz as a student at Grove City College.

Bibliography

Articles
 "Forecasting." Freeman, vol. 20, no. 1 (January 1970): 11-15.
 "What We Can Know About the World." Freeman, vol. 20 (1970): 443.
 "Omnipotent Government." Freeman, vol. 20 (1970): 440–442.
 "The Great Depression". Freeman (October 1969)
 "The Crisis in International Economic Relations." imprimis, vol. 2, no. 3 (March 1973): 1-6.

Book reviews
 Review of Omnipotent Government: The Rise of the Total State and Total War by Ludwig von Mises. Freeman, vol. 20 (1970): 440–442. Full audio.

Books

Authored
 Divided Europe. New York (1955)
 How Can Europe Survive? New York: D. Van Nostrand Company (1955)
 Moneda y libertad. Buenos Aires, Argentina (1961)
 The Great Depression. Lansing, MI (1969)
 Inflation or Gold Standard. Lansing, MI (1973)
 Death and Taxes. Washington, D.C. (1976) [2nd ed. 1982]
 Problemas económicas de actualidad. Buenos Aires, Argentina (1977)
 Age of Inflation. Belmont, MA (1977)
 The Underground Economy. Auburn, AL: Ludwig von Mises Institute (1984)
 Money and Freedom. Grove City, PA: Libertarian Press (1985)
 The Politics of Unemployment. Spring Mills, PA (1987)
 Debts and Deficits. Spring Mills, PA (1987)
 The Great Depression: Will We Repeat It?. Spring Mills, PA (1988)
 The Savings and Loan Bailout. Spring Mills, PA (1989)
 Three Economic Commandments. Spring Mills, PA (1990)
 The First Eighty Years of Grove City College. Grove City, PA (1993)
 Reflection and Remembrance. Irvington, NY (1997)
 Sowing the Wind. Grove City, PA (2004)
 Age of Inflation Continued. Grove City, PA (2006)

Edited
Gold is Money. Westport, Conn: Greenwood Press (1975)
 Free to Try. Irvington-on-Hudson, New York: Foundation for Economic Education (1995)

Further reading
 A Man of Principle: Essays in Honor of Hans F. Sennholz, edited by John W. Robbins and Mark Spangler. Grove City College Press (1992). . .
"Presented on the occasion of his seventieth birthday, February 3, 1992."
 "Misesean for Life: An Interview With Hans F. Sennholz." Austrian Economics Newsletter, vol. 22, no. 1 (Spring 2002): 1-14.

References

External links
 Sennholz's Website

1922 births
2007 deaths
American libertarians
Austrian School economists
German emigrants to the United States
German libertarians
Grove City College
Libertarian economists
New York University alumni
Foundation for Economic Education
Member of the Mont Pelerin Society